Republic Express Airlines (RPX Airlines) is a cargo airline based in Jakarta, Indonesia. It operates domestic and regional cargo services. Republic Express Airlines is listed in category 2 by Indonesian Civil Aviation Authority for airline safety quality.

History 

The airline was established in 2001 and started operations on 17 October 2001. It is wholly owned by the RPX Group. Since 1985 RPX has been the licensee in Indonesia for Federal Express. 

The European Union's ban on the airline operations have been lifted.

Destinations 

The airline flies to Batam, Jakarta, Kuala Lumpur, Surabaya, Balikpapan, Makassar, Pekanbaru and Surakarta.

Fleet 
As of December 2012, the Republic Express Airlines fleet includes:

References

External links 

 

Airlines of Indonesia
Airlines established in 2001
Cargo airlines of Indonesia
Indonesian companies established in 2001